The Kathleen Mine was a coal mine that operated in the nearby coal town of Dowell, Illinois, United States, from 1918 to 1946.  At peak production, its output was 5,000 tons/day of coal.  It was operated by the Union Colliery Company in St. Louis. Many miners who worked in the Kathleen were immigrants from eastern Europe, including Rusyns

History
The Kathleen was sunk in 1917 and the mine opened in 1918.  It was named for Kathleen McAuliffe who was the daughter of Eugene McAuliffe, the president of the colliery company.

In February, 1920 the Union Colliery Company employed over 300 men with an average monthly payroll of over $35,000.

The mine workers were members of the United Mine Workers union led by John Lewis.  Its miners went on strike from 1933 to 1937.  They struck for the right to join the Progressive Mining Union.

The Kathleen Mine closed on November 21, 1946.  Over its life, over 150 men were killed working there.

Disasters
 In February 1921 seven men were trapped and killed in the mine when a fire forced rescuers to seal the mine to contain the fire,
 Nine men were killed by carbon monoxide poisoning on August 1, 1936.  This was the worst accident in the mine's history.  Many of the deaths occurred during rescue operations,

Afterward 
The entrance to the mine has been closed.  On the site as of December, 2021 is Cobin's Salvage Yard.  There are few remaining signs of the mine that once built the village of Dowell.  A small concrete structure, the mine tipple, is the only structure that remains from the mine.

The mine has been suspected of causing sinkholes in the nearby village of Dowell.

New Kathleen Mine
A new mine operated by Union Colliery was opened north of Dowell in January 1946.  It was named the New Kathleen.  This mine closed in 1947., Land scars are still visible from this mine.

Gallery

References

Coal in Illinois
Coal mines in the United States
Mines in Illinois
Jackson County, Illinois